Anthurium subcoerulescens is a species of plant in the family Araceae endemic to Ecuador but threatened by habitat loss.  Its natural habitats are subtropical or tropical moist lowland forests and subtropical or tropical moist montane forests.

References

subcoerulescens
Endemic flora of Ecuador
Vulnerable plants
Taxonomy articles created by Polbot